Marc Lortie is a Canadian diplomat.

After graduating from Laval University with a specialized Bachelor of Arts in Political Science (International Relations) Lortie joined the Department of External Affairs, in 1971. His responsibilities there included deployments to Tunisia and Washington, D.C. In 1985, Lortie joined the Prime Minister's Office responsible for international media relations before being assigned as press secretary in 1987.

References 
 

1948 births
Ambassadors of Canada to Chile
Ambassadors of Canada to France
Ambassadors of Canada to Paraguay
Ambassadors of Canada to Spain
Ambassadors of Canada to Andorra
Université Laval alumni
People from Quebec City
Living people